The River Rat is a river in the county of Suffolk in East Anglia, England.

Its source is to the south of the village of Felsham, and is the major tributary of the River Gipping. The River Rat joins the River Gipping at Pikes Meadow in Stowmarket.

The river flows through the village of Rattlesden, and is also known as the Rattlesden River.

References

Rat